Nepal–North Korea relations refers to bilateral foreign relations between Nepal and North Korea.

History 
Nepal–North Korea relations were officially established on 15 May 1974. 

Nepal does not have an embassy in North Korea, however, Nepal's embassy in Beijing is a concurrently non-resident ambassador to North Korea. North Korea has an embassy in Kathmandu. 

In 2017, Nepal's former prime minister, Madhav Kumar Nepal, visited Pyongyang. In 2019, Nepal deported 12 North Koreans "in an attempt to abide by UN resolution 2397".

References

External links
Nepal-Democratic People’s Republic of Korea Relations, Ministry of Foreign Affairs Nepal

 
Korea, North
Nepal